The Sheep Heid Inn is a public house in Duddingston, Edinburgh, Scotland. There has reputedly been an inn on this site since 1360, although the core of the current building appears to date from the 18th century with later additions and alterations. If the 1360 foundation date was proved correct it would make The Sheep Heid Inn perhaps the oldest surviving licensed premises in Edinburgh, if not Scotland.

Origin of the name

In addition to the question of the conjectural date, the origin of the pub's name is also a matter of some debate. From the medieval period to early modern times, sheep were reared in Holyrood Park, a royal park beside Duddingston, and were slaughtered in Duddingston before being taken to the Fleshmarket in Edinburgh's Old Town. There being no great demand for the heads, the residents of Duddingston village became renowned for their culinary genius with this less than savoury item. Two dishes in particular were widely remarked upon, sheep heid broth ("powsowdie") and singed sheep heid. The local fame of the latter was even mentioned by Mrs Beeton in her famous cookery book. Indeed, until the late 19th century the use of these heads was so commonplace that the locals used the skulls as cobbles for their pathways. So the pub's name may originate here. Alternatively, and far more plausibly, its name probably came about following the royal gift in 1580 of an ornate ram's head snuff box, given by King James VI of Scotland.

Duddingston village is exactly halfway between the royal residences of Craigmillar Castle and Holyrood Palace, and James, like his mother Mary, Queen of Scots, is said to have stopped here many times and even played skittles in the courtyard behind the pub. As a mark of gratitude he presented the landlord with this highly unusual gift which remained on site for 300 years before being sold at auction to the Earl of Rosebery, whose descendants possess it still at their country seat of Dalmeny House. The pub does, however, possess a 19th-century copy behind its bar. The greater likelihood therefore is that the name was adopted for the pub to mark it apart from the many other taverns known to have existed in the locality.

History

In the intervening centuries The Sheep Heid Inn witnessed many remarkable national events. The various factions of the Covenanting years were wont to stop off as they passed to and fro, as did the Jacobite Army a century later. On this latter occasion the army of Bonnie Prince Charlie was encamped at Duddingston for a month prior to the battle of Prestonpans.

The Sheep Heid Inn also possesses an old fashioned bowling alley, built around 1880, which is reputedly the last such alley in Scotland. The Royal Company of Archers, the City Sheriffs, and the local regiments based at the nearby Piershill Barracks and Duddingston training camps, were all once regulars. The last of the old clubs to survive are the Trotters Club, founded in 1882 and who still meet in the alley once a month.

Footnotes

External links
 Sheep Heid Inn

Category B listed buildings in Edinburgh
Pubs in Edinburgh
Listed pubs in Scotland
1360 establishments in Scotland